Marymount Hermitage is a Roman Catholic hermitage for the Hermit Sisters of Mary in Mesa, Idaho, U.S.. Built on a mesa, it spans 100 acres of rangeland in Adams County.

History
The Marymount Hermitage was dedicated by Bishop Sylvester William Treinen in 1984. It has ten buildings. Initially, there were six buildings: a chapel, a library, a common room and three hermitage buildings. In 1987, three more hermitage buildings and a bell tower were built. By 1994, a new chapel was built. In 2018, a library known as he Mercy House was built. The Hermitage's main resident is Sister Beverly Greger.  

The hermitage welcomes guests on retreats.

References

External links
Marymount Hermitage

Christian hermitages in the United States
Buildings and structures in Adams County, Idaho
1984 establishments in Idaho
Religious buildings and structures completed in 1984
Roman Catholic churches in Idaho